Attell is a surname.

Notable people with the name include:

 Abe Attell (1883–1970), American boxer
 Dave Attell (born 1965), American comedian and actor
 Monte Attell (1885–1960), American boxer
 Phil Attell (born 1957), Australian rugby league footballer